Pierre Follenfant is a French sailor born on 1951 in La Rochelle. He competed in and finished the first edition of the Vendee Globe on his boat Charente Maritime. Before doing the race he raced extensively on his catamarans Charente Maritime 1 & 2.

References

1951 births
Living people
French male sailors (sport)
Sportspeople from La Rochelle
IMOCA 60 class sailors
French Vendee Globe sailors
1989 Vendee Globe sailors
Vendée Globe finishers
Single-handed circumnavigating sailors